Tulipa montana is a species of tulip native to the mountains of Iran and Turkmenistan. With its deep red petals (there is also a yellow morph) it has been proposed as a candidate for the Biblical Rose of Sharon, whose identity is unknown.

Richard Wilford in his 2006 published book "Tulips" writes "This really is one of the most alluring of the smaller tulip species".

Description

It has glaucous leaves, then blooms in early spring, or early summer, in April, or as late as July (in America).

It has cup-shaped flowers, that come in shades of red, from scarlet, crimson, to deepest blood-red. Inside the bloom, it has a greenish-black central blotch and yellow anthers. In the wild, there are also yellow forms.

Taxonomy
The Latin specific epithet montana refers to mountains or coming from mountains.

It was first found in Persia in 1826, and then published and described by John Lindley in The Botanical Register (Botanical Register; Consisting of Coloured Figures of Exotic Plants Cultivated in British Gardens; with their History and Mode of Treatment), Vol.13 on page 1106 in 1827.

Distribution and habitat
It is native to temperate Asia and Europe.

Range
It is found in the mountains of Iran, and Iraq, around the Caspian Sea.

References

Sources
 Aldén, B., S. Ryman & M. Hjertson Våra kulturväxters namn - ursprung och användning. Formas, Stockholm (Handbook on Swedish cultivated and utility plants, their names and origin). 2009 (Vara kulturvaxt namn)
 Christenhusz, M. J. M. et al. 2013. Tiptoe through the tulips – cultural history, molecular phylogenetics and classification of Tulipa (Liliaceae) Bot. * J. Linn. Soc. 172:317.
 Raamsdonk, L. W. D. van & T. de Vries 1995. Species relationships and taxonomy in Tulipa subg. Tulipa (Liliaceae) Pl. Syst. Evol. 195:37.
 Rechinger, K. H., ed. Flora iranica. 1963- (F Iran)
 Walters, S. M. et al., eds. European garden flora. 1986- (Eur Gard F)

montana
Plants described in 1828
Flora of Iraq
Flora of Iran